Ullak is a village in Sardulgarh tehsil of Mansa district of Punjab, India.

References 

Villages in Mansa district, India